Multifurca zonaria is a species of mushroom-forming fungus in the genus Russulaceae. Originally described from Thailand as a Russula species in 2003, it was moved to the newly created genus Multifurca in 2008.

References

External links
 
 

Russulales
Fungi described in 2003
Fungi of Thailand